WildBrainTV is a Canadian English language discretionary specialty channel owned by WildBrain. WildBrainTV broadcasts live-action and animated children's programming aimed towards audiences ages 6–15.

The channel first launched on June 1, 2011, under the ownership of Astral Media. It initially operated as a localized version of Disney XD, under license from Disney Channels Worldwide, as a sister network to Family Channel. Following the acquisition of Astral Media by Bell Media, Disney XD was divested to DHX Media (now WildBrain) in 2014.

In 2015, Corus Entertainment acquired the rights to programming from Disney Channel and its siblings (later launching a new Canadian Disney XD channel), resulting in DHX's existing Disney XD channel being rebranded as Family Chrgd—a brand extension of Family Channel with a similar positioning—in October 2015. The channel adopted its current branding in March 2022.

History

As Disney XD
In April 2009, Astral Media, via its subsidiary The Family Channel Inc., was granted CRTC approval for a new category 2 service under the working name "Family Extreme". The new service would feature "programming from around the world devoted to entertainment, humour, travel, games, science and technology and targeted toward children aged 6 to 17 years and their families". Astral later announced that it would launch a Canadian version of Disney XD on June 1, 2011. Operating under the Family Extreme license, the service expanded upon Family's relationship as a licensee of Disney Channel programming.

In 2012, the channel premiered its first original series, Slugterra. After the Competition Bureau approved Bell Media's takeover of Astral, Bell announced on March 4, 2013, that Disney XD, as well as its sister networks and Astral's French-language MusiquePlus and MusiMax would be divested. On October 27, 2013, the channel premiered its first original movie, Bunks, produced by Fresh TV.

On November 28, 2013, DHX Media announced that it would acquire Disney XD and its sister networks for $170 million. The acquisition was approved by the CRTC on July 24, 2014, and closed on July 31, 2014.

In that same year, Disney XD premiered the pilot for Fangbone!, in May, and a new original series, Gaming Show (In My Parents' Garage), in November.

As Family Chrgd/WildBrainTV

On April 16, 2015, it was announced that Corus Entertainment had acquired Canadian rights to Disney Channel's program library; alongside the launch of a Canadian version of Disney Channel, Corus stated that it would launch other "Disney branded kids linear television offerings" in the future, which eventually included a new Disney XD. In anticipation for this transition, DHX concurrently announced that its Disney-branded networks would be rebranded as spin-offs of Family Channel by November 2015, with Disney XD tentatively being rebranded as Family XTRM.

On August 20, 2015, DHX announced the fall lineups for its networks, revealing the final branding for Disney XD as Family Chrgd (stylized as Family CHRGD). Its lineup was to feature new seasons of the network's existing original series, in addition to new shows produced by DHX subsidiaries and other studios (such as the aforementioned Fangbone!), as well as new program supply agreements with Mattel, and later in the year, DreamWorks Animation. The re-branding took place on October 9, 2015.

On March 1, 2022, Family Chrgd rebranded as WildBrainTV, with no change in programming.

Programming

Current programming
As of March 2023:

Canadian productions

 Bajillionaires (March 29, 2021 – present)
 Carmen Sandiego (November 5, 2022 – present)
 Creeped Out (September 9, 2019 – present)
 Denis and Me (November 16, 2021 – present)
 The Deep (January 1, 2016 – present)
 Hank Zipzer (January 2, 2016 – present)
 Inspector Gadget (2018 — present)
 Johnny Test (February 5, 2018 – present)
 Mega Man: Fully Charged (September 8, 2018 – present)
 The Mr. Peabody & Sherman Show (November 3, 2018 – present)
 Slugterra (September 3, 2012 – present)
 Summer Memories (2022–present)
 Supernoobs (November 30, 2020 – present)
 Survivalists (2021 – present)

Acquired programming

 Alvinnn!!! and the Chipmunks (2018–present)
 Boy Girl Dog Cat Mouse Cheese (September 22, 2021–present)
 Cleopatra in Space (January 9, 2021 – present)
 The Epic Tales of Captain Underpants (June 20, 2020 — present)
 Home: Adventures with Tip & Oh (September 2, 2019 — present)
 The InBESTigators (March 10, 2022  — present)
 Itch
 Saving Me
 She-Ra and the Princesses of Power (July 18, 2020 – present)
 The Smurfs (February 19, 2022 – present)
 Supergirl (August 4, 2020 – present)
 Trollhunters: Tales of Arcadia (January 12, 2019 – present)
 Voltron: Legendary Defender (July 22, 2018 – present)
 Where's Waldo? (January 23, 2021 – present)

Former programming

As Disney XD (2011–2015)
Programs in bold indicate that the programmings moved to new Disney XD (Canadian TV channel)

 Aaron Stone
 American Dragon: Jake Long
 Baxter
 Crash & Bernstein
 Doraemon
 The Emperor's New School
 Even Stevens
 Fantastic Four
 Fish Hooks
 Gargoyles
 I'm In the Band
 Iron Man
 Jessie
 Kick Buttowski: Suburban Daredevil (2011-2014)
 The Legend of Tarzan (2011-2013)
 Motorcity
 The Replacements
 Spider-Man
 Star Wars Rebels
 The Suite Life of Zack & Cody
 Tron: Uprising
 Wizards of Waverly Place
 X-Men
 Yo Gabba Gabba!
 Yin Yang Yo! (2011-2012)
 Zeke & Luther

As Family Chrgd (2015–2022)

 The 7D (2014-2015)
 Are You Smarter than a 5th Grader?
 Be the Creature
 Degrassi: Next Class
 Dinotrux
 Dr. Ken
 DreamWorks Dragons
 DreamWorksTV
 Fangbone!
 Fort Boyard: Ultimate Challenge (2011-2015)
 The Fresh Prince of Bel-Air
 Gaming Show (In My Parents' Garage)
 Gravity Falls (2013-2015)
 Grizzy and the Lemmings
 Heads Up!
 Iron Man
 Just Like Mom and Dad
 Kirby Buckets (2014-2015)
 Kickin' It (2011-2015)
 Lab Rats
 Lego Star Wars: Droid Tales
 Life with Derek (2011-2015)
 Mighty Med (2013-2015)
 My Knight and Me
 My Side of the Sky
 Nature Cat
 Overruled!
 Pair of Kings (2011-2015)
 Penn Zero: Part-Time Hero (2015)
 Phineas and Ferb (2011-2015)
 Randy Cunningham: 9th Grade Ninja (2012-2015)
 Sonic Boom
 Speechless
 Star vs. the Forces of Evil (2015)
 Storm Hawks
 The Suite Life on Deck (2011-2015)
 Wander Over Yonder (2013-2015)
 Wingin it
 What's Up Warthogs!
 Xiaolin Chronicles
 Zak Storm
 The Zoo

As WildBrainTV (2022-present)

 The Adventures of Puss in Boots (June 18, 2017 – 2022)
 All Hail King Julien (April 24, 2017 – 2022)
 The Bureau of Magical Things (2022)
 Dawn of the Croods (January 7, 2019 – 2022)
 Dorg Van Dango (2022)
 Harvey Girls Forever! (March 7, 2020 – 2022)
 Lego Jurassic World: Legend of Isla Nublar (2020–2022)
 Massive Monster Mayhem (January 14, 2018 – 2022)
 Mighty Mike (December 2, 2019 – 2022)
 Nowhere Boys (January 24, 2016 – 2022)
 Pac-Man and the Ghostly Adventures (March 17, 2014 – 2022)
 Radio Free Roscoe (April 2017 – 2022)
 Rainbow Butterfly Unicorn Kitty (May 1, 2021 – 2022)
 Turbo Fast (June 14, 2016 – 2022)
 Wallace and Gromit: Cracking Contraptions (2022)

References

External links
  (currently redirects to a YouTube playlist)

WildBrain
Children's television networks in Canada
Television channels and stations established in 2011
Digital cable television networks in Canada
English-language television stations in Canada
2011 establishments in Canada